Cold Spring Harbor is the debut studio album by American recording artist Billy Joel, released on November 1, 1971, by Family Productions. The album sold poorly, receiving attention mainly after 1973's Piano Man and later albums became popular, and was reissued in 1983.

Composition and recording
Cold Spring Harbor was named after the hamlet in the town of Huntington, New York, located on Long Island Sound near Joel's hometown. The front cover was photographed at Harbor Road.

The song "Tomorrow Is Today" drew from his period of depression and hospitalization the year before. Joel later released live versions of "She's Got a Way" and "Everybody Loves You Now", first included on this album, in his Songs in the Attic (1981), recorded in live performances. "She's Got a Way" was also released as a single in early 1982, and peaked at No. 23 on the Billboard Hot 100 chart.

Production

Mastering
Through an error in the album's mastering, the songs played slightly too fast, causing Joel's voice to sound unnaturally high (one-half of a semitone higher—Joel joked that he sounded more like the Bee Gees or one of Alvin and the Chipmunks than himself). According to a long-standing rumor, when Joel first heard the finished product, he "ripped it off the turntable, ran out of the house, and threw [the record] down the street." Arthur "Artie" Ripp, owner of Family Productions and hence the owner of the original master tapes, was responsible for the production error, and the mistake cost him his friendship with Joel. He had originally signed the 22-year-old Joel to a ten-record contract that stripped Joel of all rights to the original tapes and to the publishing rights to all current and future songs.

As part of a deal with Columbia Records to release Joel from his contract, Ripp was still able to collect royalties on sales of Joel's records long after Joel's acrimonious departure from Family Productions (up until 1986's The Bridge). Ripp only sold the publishing rights to Joel's song catalog back to Joel reluctantly after intense pressure from CBS/Columbia Records president Walter Yetnikoff, who claimed he had to threaten Ripp to finalize the deal.

Remix
In July–September 1983, Ripp and Larry Elliot remixed Cold Spring Harbor at Ripp's Fidelity Studios in Studio City, California. The album's pitch was adjusted to correct Joel's vocal tone, and to enhance the album's sound Ripp brought in studio musicians Mike McGee (drums), Al Campbell (synthesizers), and L.D. Dixon (Fender Rhodes) to overdub new rhythm sections on "Everybody Loves You Now" and "Turn Around." In addition, "You Can Make Me Free" was truncated by nearly three minutes (removing most of the original tail-end, fadeout jam), and the bass, drums, and orchestration on "Tomorrow Is Today" were removed.

The remix was released through Columbia Records, without any involvement from Joel. In a 2011 interview with actor Alec Baldwin, Joel stated that despite the remix, he believes that the album still does not sound very good.

Track listing
All songs written by Billy Joel.

Personnel

Musicians
 Billy Joel  – acoustic piano, Hammond organ, harpsichord, harmonica, vocals
 Rhys Clark  – drums on "Everybody Loves You Now" (1971 mix), "Falling of the Rain", "Turn Around" (1971 mix), and "Tomorrow Is Today" (1971 mix), cymbals on "She's Got a Way"
 Sal DiTroia – guitar
 Don Evans – guitar
 Jimmie Haskell – arrangements, conductor
 Sneaky Pete Kleinow – pedal steel guitar on "Turn Around"
 Larry Knechtel – bass
 Joe Osborn – bass
 Artie Ripp – arrangements, conductor
 Denny Seiwell – drums on "You Can Make Me Free" and "You Look So Good to Me"
 Mike McGee – drums on "Everybody Loves You Now" and "Turn Around" (1983 remixes)
 Al Campbell – keyboards on "Turn Around" (1983 remix)
 L. D. Dixon – Fender Rhodes on "Turn Around" (1983 remix)

Production
 Artie Ripp – producer, engineer, remixing, editing, director
 Irwin Mazur – executive producer, art direction
 Larry Elliott – engineer, remixing, editing
 John Bradley – engineer
 Michael D. Stone – second engineer
 Gordon Watanabe – assistant engineer
 Bob Huges – mastering (LP)
 Doug Sax – mastering (1987 CD)
 Joseph Palmaccio – remastering (1998 CD)
 Ted Jensen – remastering (2011 CD)

Charts

Notes
A  Cold Spring Harbor peaked at number 202 on the Billboard Bubbling Under the Top LP's chart in 1972. The album was then re-issued by Columbia in December 1983. All chart positions listed for Cold Spring Harbor are for its reissue.

References

Billy Joel albums
1971 debut albums
Columbia Records albums
Quality Records albums
Philips Records albums
Albums conducted by Jimmie Haskell
Albums arranged by Jimmie Haskell
Albums recorded at Record Plant (Los Angeles)